Alan Barnes is a British writer and editor, mainly related to cult film and television.

Biography
Barnes is from Newcastle upon Tyne. He was the editor of Judge Dredd Megazine from 2001 until 2005. Among other strips, Barnes originally commissioned The Simping Detective. He also wrote a handful of Judge Dredd stories involving alternate universes or featuring a young Dredd.

He worked for five years at Doctor Who Magazine and progressed from writing strips to becoming joint editor in 1998 and sole editor from 2000 until 2002. He subsequently contributed the ongoing Fact of Fiction series of articles to the magazine.

Barnes has written or co-written a number of Doctor Who audio plays for Big Finish Productions.

He has written a number of books on films, including James Bond, Quentin Tarantino and Sherlock Holmes, and his book The Hammer Story, co-written with Marcus Hearn, was nominated for the Bram Stoker Award for Best Non-Fiction in 1997.

Bibliography

Comics and magazines

Judge Dredd:
 "Tickers" (with Maya Gavin, in Judge Dredd Megazine 3.14, 1996)
 "Medusa" (with Paul Peart and Roger Langridge, in Judge Dredd Lawman of the Future #19-20, 1996)
 "Dredd of Drokk Green" (with Trevor Hairsine, in Judge Dredd Mega Special 1996)
Doctor Who:
 "The Cybermen: The Hungry Sea" (with Adrian Salmon, in Doctor Who Magazine #227-229)
 "The Cybermen: The Dark Flame" (with Adrian Salmon, in Doctor Who Magazine #230-233)
 End Game (212 pages) collects:
 "End Game" (with Martin Geraghty, in Doctor Who Magazine #244-247)
 "The Keep" (with Martin Geraghty, in Doctor Who Magazine #248-249)
 "A Life of Matter & Death" (with Sean Longcroft, in Doctor Who Magazine #250)
 "Fire and Brimstone" (with Martin Geraghty, #251-255)
 "Tooth and Claw" (with Martin Geraghty, in Doctor Who Magazine #257-260)
 "The Final Chapter" (with Martin Geraghty, in Doctor Who Magazine #262-265)
 The Glorious Dead (244 pages, 2006) collects:
 "The Road to Hell" (with Martin Geraghty, in Doctor Who Magazine #278-282)
 "TV Action!" (with Roger Langridge, in Doctor Who Magazine #283)
 "The Warkeeper's Crown" (with Martin Geraghty, in Doctor Who Magazine #378-380)

Audio plays

Audio plays include:
Storm Warning
Neverland
Zagreus (with Gary Russell)
The Next Life (with Gary Russell)
The Girl Who Never Was
Gallifrey: Weapon of Choice
Gallifrey: A Blind Eye
Gallifrey: Panacea
Brotherhood of the Daleks
Izzy's Story
Castle of Fear
Orbis (with Nicholas Briggs)
Death in Blackpool
Nevermore
Jago and Litefoot: The Bellova Devil
Heroes of Sontar
Trail of the White Worm
The Oseidon Adventure
Destiny of the Doctor: Enemy Aliens
Gods and Monsters (with Mike Maddox)
Daleks Among Us
Trial of the Valeyard (with Mike Maddox)
White Ghosts
Dark Eyes 2: The White Room
Last of the Cybermen
Suburban Hell
The Red House
The Churchill Years: Hounded
And You Will Obey Me
Gallery of Ghouls

He also wrote the animated serial, The Infinite Quest.

Books
Books include:

The Hammer Story (with Marcus Hearn, originally published 1997, Titan Books, 1999 )
Kiss Kiss Bang! Bang!: The Unofficial James Bond Film Companion (with Marcus Hearn, Overlook Press, 1998 )
Tarantino A to Zed (with Marcus Hearn, B.T. Batsford Ltd, 1999 )
Sherlock Holmes on Screen (originally published 1999, Reynolds & Hearn Ltd, 2004 ), Third Edition published 31 January 2012 by Titan Books,

References

 Profile at 2000ad.org

Living people
Year of birth missing (living people)
British male writers
British magazine editors
Comic book editors